Hooi Hooi Lean is a Malaysian economist and a professor at the School of Social Sciences in the Economics program at University of Science, Malaysia. Lean acts as an associate editor of Singapore Economic Review, Capital Market Review and Frontiers in Energy and an editor of J. of Asian Finance, Economics and Business and East Asian J. of Business Management.

Early life and work 
Hooi Hooi Lean was born and raised in Penang, Malaysia. She graduated from the University of Malaya with a Bachelor of Economics in Statistics and obtained her Master of Science in Statistics from Universiti Sains Malaysia. She attained her Ph.D. in Economics from the National University of Singapore and served as a post-doctoral visiting scholar at Monash University, Australia's Department of Economics. Additionally, Lean has been a visiting scholar at SungKyunKwan University in South Korea, Tamkang University in Taiwan, CEREFIGE Universitè Nancy 2 in France, and Auckland University of Technology in New Zealand.

Select publications

References

Living people
Year of birth missing (living people)
Malaysian economists
People from Penang